John Westwood may refer to:

Football
John Portsmouth Football Club Westwood (born 1963), English football supporter
John Westwood (footballer) (born 1886), pre-First World War English footballer
Johnny Weston, footballer in 1945–46 Colchester United F.C. season
John Westwood (1950s footballer) from List of foreign Ligue 1 players: E
johnny Westwood Country Singer (born 1968), English, Cambridge

Others
John Obadiah Westwood (1805–1893), English entomologist and archaeologist
John Westwood (politician), American state representative in Utah
John Westwood (entrepreneur), subject of painting by Joshua Johnson